Here Is Everything is the third studio album by British indie rock band the Big Moon, released on 14 October 2022 via Fiction Records.

Background 
In January 2020, the Big Moon released their second studio album Walking Like We Do to positive reviews.

The Big Moon were getting ready to release their follow-up to Walking Like We Do in early 2021, including being about to shoot the music video for the first single. However, the band "decided to put the brakes on and give it some breathing space", according to Juliette Jackson. Jackson giving birth to a son forced her to reconsider the project.

Singles 
The lead single "Wide Eyes" was released alongside the announcement of the album on 13 July 2022. The single "Wide Eyes" was written by Jackson in late 2021, after the birth of her son, alongside Jessica Winter. Jackson said that she "was desperate to write a really big, happy song" with "Wide Eyes" and said that Winter's contributions "helped me turn those jumbled feelings into a song".

The second single from the album titled "Trouble" was released on 5 September 2022. The track deals with Jackson's trauma surrounding giving birth. Clash described the track as a "mature, melodic, and insightful look at motherhood".

The album's third single, "This Love" was released on 5 October 2022.

Critical reception 

Upon its release, Here Is Everything received positive reviews from music critics. At Metacritic, which assigns a normalized rating out of 100 to reviews from mainstream critics, the album has an average score of 77, based on 7 critical reviews, indicating "generally favourable reviews". In a positive review, Kyann-Sian Williams of NME rated Here Is Everything four out of five stars, calling it "emotive and glossy" and "gives space to breathe in this busy world". A review for The Line of Best Fit states that, with Here Is Everything, The Big Moon have "shown us their rawest moments and the deepest parts of their psyche" in its introspective discussion of motherhood.

Track listing

Personnel 
The Big Moon
 Juliette Jackson – vocals, guitars
 Soph Nathan – background vocals, guitars, bass
 Celia Archer – background vocals, keyboards, piano, bass
 Fern Ford – background vocals, keyboards, drums

Musicians
 Jessica Winter – synthesisers

Production
 Adam Barlett – producer
 Kevin Tuffy – mastering engineer
 Matt Wiggins – mixing engineer
 Marcus Locock – assistant mixing engineer

Charts

References 

The Big Moon albums
2022 albums
Fiction Records albums